Abdoliyeh-ye Sharqi Rural District is a rural district (dehestan) in the Central District of Ramshir County, Khuzestan Province, Iran. At the 2006 census, its population was 4,205, in 734 families.  The rural district has 29 villages.

References 

Rural Districts of Khuzestan Province
Ramshir County